The 2009 CCHA Men's Ice Hockey Tournament was the 38th CCHA Men's Ice Hockey Tournament. It was played between March 6 and March 21, 2009 at campus locations and at Joe Louis Arena in Detroit, Michigan, United States. Notre Dame won their second CCHA Men's Ice Hockey Tournament and Mason Cup and received the Central Collegiate Hockey Association's automatic bid to the 2009 NCAA Division I Men's Ice Hockey Tournament.

Format
The tournament features four rounds of play. In the first round, the fifth and twelfth, sixth and eleventh, seventh and tenth, and eighth and ninth seeds as determined by the final regular season standings play a best-of-three series, with the winner advancing to the quarterfinals. There, the first seed and lowest-ranked first-round winner, the second seed and second-lowest-ranked first-round winner, the third seed and second-highest-ranked first-round winner, and the fourth seed and highest-ranked first-round winner play a best-of-three series, with the winner advancing to the semifinals. In the semifinals, the highest and lowest seeds and second-highest and second-lowest seeds play a single game, with the winner advancing to the championship game and the loser advancing to the third-place game. The tournament champion receives an automatic bid to the 2009 NCAA Men's Division I Ice Hockey Tournament.

Regular season standings
Note: GP = Games played; W = Wins; L = Losses; T = Ties; PTS = Points; GF = Goals For; GA = Goals Against

Bracket

Note: * denotes overtime period(s)

First round

(5) Ohio State vs. (12) Bowling Green

(6) Northern Michigan vs. (11) Michigan State

(7) Western Michigan vs. (10) Lake Superior State

(8) Nebraska-Omaha vs. (9) Ferris State

Quarterfinals

(1) Notre Dame vs. (8) Nebraska-Omaha

(2) Michigan vs. (7) Western Michigan

(3) Miami vs. (6) Northern Michigan

(4) Alaska vs. (5) Ohio State

Semifinals

(1) Notre Dame vs. (6) Northern Michigan

(2) Michigan vs. (4) Alaska

Third place

(4) Alaska vs. (6) Northern Michigan

Championship

(1) Notre Dame vs. (2) Michigan

Tournament awards

All-Tournament Team
F Ben Ryan (Notre Dame)
F Calle Ridderwall (Notre Dame)
F Louie Caporusso (Michigan)
D Steven Kampfer (Michigan)
D Ian Cole (Notre Dame)
G Jordan Pearce* (Notre Dame)
* Most Valuable Player(s)

References

External links
2009 CCHA Men's Ice Hockey Tournament

CCHA Men's Ice Hockey Tournament
Ccha tournament